Wembley tube station could refer to one of a number of London Underground stations serving the Wembley area of north London:

 Wembley Park
 Wembley Central
 North Wembley

Disambig-Class London Transport articles